The C-5 is a line and rail service of Cercanías Madrid commuter rail network, operated by Renfe Operadora. It runs from Móstoles El Soto to Humanes, passing through the cities of Móstoles, Alcorcón, Madrid, Leganés and Fuenlabrada.

List of stations
The following table lists the name of each station served by line C-5 in order from west to south; the station's service pattern offered by C-5 trains; the transfers to other Cercanías Madrid lines; remarkable transfers to other transport systems; the municipality in which each station is located; and the fare zone each station belongs to according to the Madrid Metro fare zone system.

References

Cercanías Madrid